The Yalijux shrew (Cryptotis oreoryctes) is a species of mammal in the family Soricidae. It is endemic to Guatemala.

References

Cryptotis
Fauna of Guatemala
Mammals described in 2011